is a Japanese screenwriter and novelist that mostly known for his work on the Blood franchise and Ghost in the Shell: Arise series, produced by Production I.G.

Career
Junichi Fujisaku started working at Production I.G in the late 1990s. He acted as a planning assistant when Blood: The Last Vampire anime film was in development. The film was released in 2000, and that same year, he chief directed, written and edited the video game adaptation of The Last Vampire. A year later, Fujisaku wrote two novelizations based on the anime film.

In 2005, Fujisaku directed and wrote the spin-off anime of Blood: The Last Vampire, titled Blood+. He created the series to expland the Blood universe that wasn't explored in The Last Vampire film. The anime ran for fifty episodes, and became its own franchise with two light novel adaptations, three manga adaptations, and two video games. That same year, Fujisaku co-wrote the screenplay for both xxxHolic: A Midsummer Night's Dream and Tsubasa Reservoir Chronicle the Movie: The Princess in the Birdcage Kingdom.

In 2010, Fujisaku debuted his film directorial work, Loups=Garous.

In 2011, Fujisaku was a head writer for  both Moshidora and Appleseed XIII. That same year, Fujisaku, with studio Production I.G, collaborated with manga artist group CLAMP in the new anime entry of the Blood franchise, titled Blood-C. He acted as a creative supervisor, and co-wrote the scripts with CLAMP member and leader Nanase Ohkawa. The anime ran for twelve episodes, and continued with the sequel anime film, Blood-C: The Last Dark the following year, with Fujisaku as a co-writer once again. The anime received two novelizations and two manga adaptations within those two years, and Fujisaku wrote the novel adaptations, and story consulted the prequel manga, Blood-C: Demonic Moonlight.

In 2015, Fujisaku was a head writer for Pikaia!. Around the same year, Fujisaku wrote the script for a stage play adaptation of Blood-C, titled Blood-C: The Last Mind. The play was set between the twelve episode anime and The Last Dark film. Fujisaku also wrote the first stage adaptation for Ghost in the Shell series, titled Ghost in the Shell Arise: Ghost is Alive.

In 2017, Fujisaku wrote a novelization of Blood+ anime titled Blood#, which takes place after the series finale, focusing on Diva's grown children, Hibiki and Kanade. That same year, he was in charge of writing the script for the first live-action film adaptation of Blood-C, titled Asura Girl: Blood-C Another Story, acting as a prequel to the series.

In 2018, Fujisaku co-wrote the script with director Shutaro Oku on the second live-action film adaptation for Blood-C, titled Blood-Club Dolls 1, and its sequel, Blood-Club Dolls 2 in 2020. Both films take place before the events of The Last Dark anime film.

In 2020, Fujisaku collaborated with director Oku once again on VR Noh stage play of Ghost in the Shell, simply titled VR Noh: Ghost in the Shell.

In 2021, Fujisaku was a head writer for the anime adaptation of Mars Red. That same year, it was announced that he will chief direct and screenwrite for Deemo: Memorial Keys anime film, which was released in February 2022. That same year, Fujisaku acted as a head writer for the live-action GaruGaku series.

Filmography

Anime

Anime film

OVA

Video games

Live-action drama

Live-action film

Stage

Bibliography

Novels
Blood: The Last Vampire

Blood+

Blood-C

Manga

References

External links
 
 

Japanese novelists
Japanese screenwriters
1967 births
Living people